Porky's Party is a 1938 Warner Bros. Looney Tunes cartoon directed by Bob Clampett. The short was released on June 25, 1938, and stars Porky Pig.

Plot
The cartoon begins with Porky Pig lighting candles on a birthday cake while singing and stuttering, 'Happy Birthday' to himself. This was followed by a doorbell. Porky looks to the left while Black Fury steals a bit of cake. Porky then rushes to the door with the mailman knock to "shave and a haircut" as Porky opens the door, but the mailman ends up continuing to knock on Porky's head twice. The mailman speaks to Porky and he received a package from his uncle, Pinkus. There is a letter to him as Porky opens up and reads it, telling that he got a tiny silkworm. The silkworm however came from a big box, and begins to do stuff. He first knits garments whenever the word sew is spoken. Porky commands the worm to sew and it sews a sock as Porky and his dog, Black Fury, look on in awe. Porky gives the command again.  The worm sews a brassiere, which Porky disposes of bashfully as he puts the worm in his coat. After discussing to Black Fury, Porky and Black Fury enter the bathroom where Porky applies hair-growth formula on his own head, producing no results. Then, needing to get ready, Porky hurriedly leaves the bathroom. Black Fury takes the formula and squirts 16 drops in his head until knowing that it contains 99% alcohol, and he begins to drink it. He then starts to have the hiccups, and becomes intoxicated, loudly shouting "Happy Birthday!"

Meanwhile, Porky hears the doorbell again including a knock at the door with the same tune to the mailman including two knocks on Porky's head. It is his friend Penguin, who rushes in, gives Porky a larger present, and begins wolfing down ice cream and ends up slicing the cake - to which he leaves the slice and takes the remaining cake. Goosey (with a pre-Daffy smile) saunters in and holds out his hand for Porky to shake. The hand is a prop, adorned with a sign reading "Happy Birthday, Fat Boy!". Porky then angrily throws the sign and looked at Goosey as he turned to the right, and he chuckles at him, stating "He's so silly." Porky repeatedly stutters the word so, causing the silkworm in Porky's pocket to mistake the word for "sew" and begins sewing garment after garment. As garments come from underneath Porky's jacket, he notices they are women's underwear and brassieres; he hides them guiltily. He then tosses the silkworm away from him. The silkworm then lands in Penguin's ice cream, and continues sewing garments, which end up in the ice cream. Disgusted, Penguin pulls a sock out of the ice cream after he caught it with his spoon. He continues eating until after disgusted came from his mouth. He pulls him out of his mouth and as he has difficulty swallowing, a top hat forms in his mouth. He throws it and eats another load of ice cream, but he accidentally ate another top hat. The hat pops up, and Penguin's head assumes the shape of it. Failing to quell the hat, Penguin shouts for Goosey's help, who rams Penguin's head into the wall twice. After the Penguin thanked Goosey, he  hitting him with a mallet with a bit daze, and slams a washtub over his head, to no avail by forming a hole.

Meanwhile, back to Black Fury, looking shaggy after ingesting the hair-growth formula, attempts to do the opposite. After putting on the cream, he starts the electric razor by turning the knobs. The razor takes on the qualities of a snake, and attacks Black Fury as he runs to the hallway. Porky mistakes Black Fury for a mad dog while Porky finishes the last pieces of the ice cream, and the party guests including Porky (acting like a train while holding Goosey) rushed around the house with Black Fury, not realizing that the "rabid dog" is actually Porky's pet. Penguin then acts like he is acting like the clothes hanger while Porky and Goosey rushed along, as Penguin puts the real stool back. After several more antics including the 3 managing suitcases, Porky and Goosey rushed inside the closet, and leaving the Penguin alone after slammed by the door, Porky and Goosey looked to the right while holding a match knowing it is Black Fury. And the 2 screamed while Penguin knocks on the door telling that he wants to come in. Porky and Goosey runs over Penguin in the flash and managed the suitcases and Penguin starts to throw a fit, and Black Fury runs over Penguin and he stops arguing. Both Black Fury and Penguin rushed to Porky's bed and hides under his blanket. Penguin then screams when he saw Black Fury with still the shaving cream on. The bed then opens up, with Porky and Goosey hiding under. Porky and Goosey both rushed out of the room and Penguin (attached by a bedroom spring) starts springing forwards and backwards, and gets attacked by Black Fury. The shaving cream dissolved during the fight, and Porky sees that it is just Black Fury. Penguin angrily rolls up his "sleeve" and stares Black Fury down, uttering "So..." in anticipation of a fight. This sets off the silkworm, who wraps Penguin up into a state of mummification and once again has a top hat pop up as his head. Goosey then hits Penguin in the head with a mallet from earlier, and forcing him to feel daze as the cartoon ends.

Production notes
Chuck Jones was an animator in Clampett's unit at this time, and his work can be easily identified, particularly in the scene where Black Fury gets drunk on hair restoration tonic. Jones became a director and was awarded his own unit shortly after this cartoon was produced.

Home media
The cartoon is available (uncut, uncensored, and in its original black and white format) on the third volume of the Looney Tunes Golden Collection, with a special optional commentary track by Ren and Stimpy creator John Kricfalusi and animator Eddie Fitzgerald, as well as a storyboard featuring drawings that originally had Gabby Goat and Petunia Pig as party attendees, but, for reasons unknown, they were replaced by Goosey and Penguin.

References

External links

Looney Tunes shorts
1938 films
Films directed by Bob Clampett
American black-and-white films
1930s American animated films
Porky Pig films
Films scored by Carl Stalling
1938 animated films
Films about birthdays
Animated films about animals